The 1906 All-Ireland Senior Football Championship Final was the nineteenth All-Ireland Final and the deciding match of the 1906 All-Ireland Senior Football Championship, an inter-county Gaelic football tournament for the top teams in Ireland. 

Dublin trailed 0-3 to 0-2 at half-time, but came back to win. 

It was the third of five All-Ireland football titles won by Dublin in the 1900s.

References

Gaelic football
All-Ireland Senior Football Championship Finals
Cork county football team matches
Dublin county football team matches